Weird Science is a 1985 American science fantasy buddy comedy film written and directed by John Hughes and starring Anthony Michael Hall, Ilan Mitchell-Smith, and Kelly LeBrock. The title is taken from a pre-Comics Code Authority 1950s EC Comics magazine of the same name, the rights to which were acquired by the film's producer Joel Silver. The title song was written and performed by American New Wave band Oingo Boingo.

Plot
Nerdy social outcast students Gary Wallace and Wyatt Donnelly of Shermer High School (the same fictional high school used in The Breakfast Club) are humiliated by senior jocks Ian and Max for swooning over their cheerleader girlfriends Deb and Hilly. Rejected and disappointed at their direction in life and wanting more, Gary convinces the uptight Wyatt that they need a boost of popularity in order to get their crushes away from Ian and Max. Alone for the weekend with Wyatt's parents gone, Gary is inspired by the 1931 classic Frankenstein to create a virtual woman using Wyatt's computer, infusing her with everything they can conceive to make the perfect dream woman.

After hooking electrodes to a doll and hacking into a government computer system for more power, a power surge creates Lisa, a beautiful and intelligent woman with unlimited magical powers. Promptly, she conjures up a pink 1959 Cadillac Eldorado convertible to take the boys to a dive bar in Chicago, using her powers to manipulate people into believing Gary and Wyatt are of age.

They return home drunk and happen upon Chet, Wyatt's mean older brother, who extorts money from him to buy his silence. Lisa agrees to keep herself hidden from him, but she realizes that Gary and Wyatt, while extremely sweet, are very uptight and need to unwind. After another humiliating experience at the mall when Max and Ian pour an Icee on Gary and Wyatt in front of a crowd, Lisa tells the bullies about a party at Wyatt's house, of which Wyatt had no prior knowledge, before driving off in a Porsche 928 she conjured for Gary.

Despite Wyatt's protests, Lisa insists that the party happen anyway in order to loosen the boys up. She goes to meet Gary's parents, Al and Lucy, who, to Gary's embarrassment, are shocked and dismayed at the things she says and her frank manner. After she pulls a gun on them (later revealed to Gary to be a water pistol), she alters their memories so that Lucy forgets about the conflict; however, Al forgets that they had a son altogether.

At the Donnelly house, the party has spun out of control while Gary and Wyatt take refuge in the bathroom, where they resolve to have a good time, despite having embarrassed themselves in front of Deb and Hilly. In Wyatt's bedroom, Ian and Max convince Gary and Wyatt to recreate the events that created Lisa, but it fails. Lisa chides them over their misuse of the magic to impress their tormentors. She also explains that they forgot to connect the doll; thus, with the bare but live electrodes resting on a magazine page showing a Pershing II medium-range ballistic missile, a real missile appears, crashing through the house.

Meanwhile, Wyatt's grandparents arrive and confront Lisa about the party, but she freezes them and hides them in a cupboard. Lisa realizes that the boys need a challenge to boost their confidence and has a gang of mutant bikers invade the party, causing chaos and sending the boys running.

When the bikers take Deb and Hilly hostage, Wyatt and Gary decide to confront the bikers, causing Deb and Hilly to fall in love with them. The bikers leave, and the next morning, Chet discovers the house in disarray, including a localized snowstorm in his room, and the missile. Lisa tells the boys to escort the girls home while she talks to Chet alone. Gary and Wyatt proclaim their feelings, and both girls reciprocate their feelings to the boys.

Returning to the house, the boys discover Chet, now transformed into a talking mutant blob. He apologizes to Wyatt for his behavior. Upstairs, Lisa assures them that Chet will soon return to normal, and, realizing that her purpose is complete, hugs both Gary and Wyatt before de-materializing. As she leaves, the house is magically cleaned and everything transformed back to normal, including Chet. Wyatt's parents return home, completely unaware that anything odd has happened.

Later at Gary and Wyatt's high school, Lisa turns up as the new gym teacher, thus continuing her mission to look out for the two boys.

Cast

 Anthony Michael Hall as Gary Wallace
 Ilan Mitchell-Smith as Wyatt Donnelly
 Kelly LeBrock as Lisa
 Bill Paxton as Chet Donnelly
 Robert Downey Jr. as Ian
 Robert Rusler as Max
 Suzanne Snyder as Deb
 Judie Aronson as Hilly
 Vernon Wells as Lord General
 Jennifer Balgobin as Biker Girl
 Jeff Jensen as Metal Face
 Britt Leach and Barbara Lang as Al and Lucy Wallace, Gary's parents
 Ivor Barry and Ann Coyle as Henry and Carmen Donnelly, Wyatt and Chet's grandparents
 Doug MacHugh and Pamela Gordon as Mr. and Mrs. Donnelly, Wyatt and Chet's parents
 Michael Berryman as Mutant Biker
 John Kapelos as Dino
 D'Mitch Davis as The Bartender
 Chino 'Fats' Williams as Bar Patron
 Steve James as Guy at Table (uncredited) 
 Jill Whitlow as Susan, the perfume salesgirl
 Wallace Langham (as Wally Ward) as Art
 Renee Props as Member of The Weenies
 Kym Malin as Girl playing piano

Production
Model Kelly Emberg was initially cast as Lisa, but she left after two days due to "creative differences". LeBrock was hired as her replacement.
Vernon Wells reprises his memorable biker character Wez from Mad Max 2, but is credited in this movie as "Lord General". 

Filming began on October 2, 1984. Most of the location shooting was filmed around neighbourhoods outside of Chicago, Illinois, whereas the rest of production was filmed on sound stages and the backlot at Universal Studios in Los Angeles, California. Production wrapped on December 21, 1984.

Reception
Roger Ebert called LeBrock "wonderful" in her role and thought that as a result the film was "funnier, and a little deeper, than the predictable story it might have been." Janet Maslin of The New York Times wrote that "Mr. Hughes shows that he can share the kind of dumb joke that only a 14-year old boy could love. There are enough moviegoing 14-year old boys to make a hit out of Weird Science, of course, but for the rest of the population, its pandering is strenuous enough to be cause for alarm."

Variety wrote, "Weird Science is not nearly as weird as it should have been and, in fact, is a rather conventional kids-in-heat film, and a chaste one at that. Director-writer John Hughes squanders the opportunity to comment on the power struggle between the sexes for a few easy laughs." Gene Siskel of the Chicago Tribune gave the film one-and-a-half stars out of four and wrote, "What a disappointment Weird Science is! A wonderful writer-director has taken a cute idea about two teenage Dr. Frankensteins creating a perfect woman by computer and turned it into a vulgar, mindless, special-effects-cluttered wasteland."

Sheila Benson of the Los Angeles Times described LeBrock as "triumphant" and the "film's greatest asset", but thought the film's appeal was limited to audiences of 15-year-old boys and "maybe the 16-year olds, if they aren't yet too fussy." Rita Kempley of The Washington Post wrote, "Unbelievably, John Hughes, the maker of Sixteen Candles and The Breakfast Club, writes and directs this snickering, sordid, special effects fantasy, with Kelly LeBrock in a demeaning role as love slave to a pair of 15-year olds."

On the review aggregator Rotten Tomatoes, the film has an approval rating of 56% based on 36 reviews, and an average rating of 5.6/10. The consensus states: "Hardly in the same league as John Hughes' other teen movies, the resolutely goofy Weird Science nonetheless gets some laughs via its ridiculous premise and enjoyable performances." The film is now regarded as a cult classic. The film grossed $23,834,048 in North America and $15.1 million in other territories, totaling $38,934,048 worldwide.

Soundtrack
The film's theme song, "Weird Science," was performed by Oingo Boingo and written by the band's frontman Danny Elfman. The soundtrack album was released on MCA Records:
 "Weird Science" — Oingo Boingo
 "Private Joy" — Cheyne
 "The Circle" — Max Carl
 "Turn It On" — Kim Wilde
 "Deep in the Jungle" — Wall of Voodoo
 "Do Not Disturb (Knock Knock)" — The Broken Homes
 "Forever" — Taxxi
 "Why Don't Pretty Girls Look at Me" — The Wild Men Of Wonga
 "Method to My Madness" — The Lords of the New Church
 "Eighties" — Killing Joke
 "Weird Romance" — Ira and the Geeks

Legacy

Television series

A television series based on the film ran for 88 episodes, from 1994 to 1998. Following the same basic plot as the film, the series starred Vanessa Angel as Lisa, Michael Manasseri as Wyatt, John Mallory Asher as Gary, and Lee Tergesen as Chet.

Remake and sequel
, Universal Studios was planning a Weird Science remake with original producer Joel Silver returning, and Michael Bacall writing the film. The film was set to attempt to distinguish itself from the original Weird Science by being an edgier comedy, in line with 21 Jump Street and The Hangover, which were R-rated; the studio stated the rating for this Weird Science remake was not certain at that stage of the movie's development. However, as of mid-2019, nothing of the remake had materialized. In 2017, Ilan Mitchell-Smith talked about a sequel to Weird Science starring Channing Tatum.

References

External links

 
 
 
 
 
 
 

1985 films
1985 comedy films
1980s buddy comedy films
1980s coming-of-age comedy films
1980s fantasy comedy films
1980s science fiction comedy films
1980s sex comedy films
1980s teen comedy films
1980s teen fantasy films
American buddy comedy films
American coming-of-age comedy films
American fantasy comedy films
American science fiction comedy films
American sex comedy films
American teen comedy films
1980s English-language films
Films about artificial intelligence
Films about computing
Films adapted into television shows
Films based on American comics
Films directed by John Hughes (filmmaker)
Puppet films
Films produced by Joel Silver
Films scored by Ira Newborn
Films set in Illinois
Films shot in Chicago
Films with screenplays by John Hughes (filmmaker)
Nerd culture
Silver Pictures films
Teen buddy films
Teen sex comedy films
Teen science fiction films
Universal Pictures films
Comedy franchises
1980s American films